In 1965, the Icelandic football tournament was held for the 54th time. KR won its 19th title after defeating ÍA 2–1 in an extra game for the championship after both teams where tied with 13 points at the end of the season. KR's Baldvin Baldvinsson was the top scorer with 11 goals.. Six teams participated; KR , Fram , ÍBA , ÍA , Valur and Keflavík.

League standings

Results
Each team played every opponent once home and away for a total of 10 matches.

Championship match

References

Úrvalsdeild karla (football) seasons
Iceland
Iceland
Urvalsdeild